The 1930 Wisconsin Badgers football team was an American football team that represented the University of Wisconsin in the 1930 Big Ten Conference football season. The team compiled a 6–2–1 record (2–2–1 against conference opponents), finished in a tie for fourth place in the Big Ten Conference, and outscored all opponents by a combined total of 227 to 40. Glenn Thistlethwaite was in his fourth year as Wisconsin's head coach.

Tackle Milo Lubratovich was a consensus first-team player on both the 1930 College Football All-America Team and the 1930 All-Big Ten Conference football team. Guard Greg Kabat was selected by the Associated Press (AP) as a first-team player on the All-Big Ten team, and end Milt Gantenbein was selected by the AP, UP, and NEA as a second-team All-Big Ten player.

Halfback Ernie Lusby was selected as the team's most valuable player. Gantenbein was the team captain.

The team played its home games at Camp Randall Stadium, which had a capacity of 38,293. During the 1930 season, the average attendance at home games was 18,175.

Schedule

References

Wisconsin
Wisconsin Badgers football seasons
Wisconsin Badgers football